Painted Dog Conservation was founded in 1992 by wildlife conservation biologist Greg Rasmussen for the protection of the painted dogs (Lycaon pictus) and their habitat. Painted Dog Conservation works to engage and incorporate local communities in protecting painted dogs in Zimbabwe. The painted dog, or African wild dog, was once common in Africa with estimates of over half a million spread among 39 countries. Current estimates put their numbers at about 3,000 only found in Tanzania, Zambia, Mozambique, Zimbabwe, Botswana and South Africa. Since PDC's creation, Zimbabwe's wild dog population has increased from 400 to 700 individuals. Painted Dog Conservation is partnered with the Wildlife Conservation Network.

Programs

Collars and road signs
Painted Dog Conservation uses catch-and-release techniques and places colored collars on the dogs to demonstrate to local ranchers that the dogs are few in numbers and have convinced many of them to not shoot at the dogs. The reflective collars, combined with signs at key crossing areas, have reduced road collisions by 50%.

Anti-poaching units
Painted Dog Conservation has created anti-poaching units staffed by locals to provide protection, gather data and collect poaching snares.

Snare wire art
The snares collected by the anti-poaching units are given to local community artists who turn them into animal sculptures. Through sales of these snares and other crafts they spread the conservation message of the painted dogs both to their own community and internationally.

Monitoring
Painted Dog Conservation uses radio collars to collect information about pack movements. This information contributes to their relocation to predator-friendly areas and to expand their range when needed.

Rehabilitation
A Painted Dog Conservation rehabilitation facility is available for injured painted dogs until they can be re-released into the wild.

Bush camp
Painted Dog Conservation holds a free environmental bush camp for local 6th-grade school children by local guides in hopes of inspiring them in conservation.

Visitors center
Painted Dog Conservation's visitor center was completed in 2007. The center offers an education facility including a painted dog viewing platform and an interpretive hall.

References

External links

 Painted Dog Conservation
  Painted Dog Conservation (UK)
 Wildlife Conservation Network

Animal conservation organizations
Organizations established in 1992
Mammal conservation
Dog organizations
Animal welfare organisations based in Zimbabwe